"Tonight" is a song co-written and recorded by American country music duo Sugarland.  It was released in April 2011 as the third single from their album The Incredible Machine.  The song was written by Jennifer Nettles, Kristian Bush and Kevin Griffin.

Critical reception
Blake Boldt of Engine 145 gave the song a thumbs down, saying that it "is consistently dull in content" and that the single felt "unfocused, without an anchor," while calling Nettles' vocal performance "below-par."

Music video
The video for "Tonight" was released on VEVO on April 22, 2011, and was directed by Marcus Raboy. The video starts with Nettles against a green background in a red dress sitting on a tan booth before switching to a second outfit where she is in black, at a photo shoot. The last scene shows her in a white outfit in a white bedroom, lounging on and in the bed. Also, Bush is seen playing guitar in a photo shop.

Chart performance
"Tonight" debuted at number 54 on the U.S. Billboard Hot Country Songs chart for the week dated May 7, 2011. It peaked at number 32 in its seventh week, making it their lowest-peaking song of their career to date.

References

2011 singles
2010 songs
Sugarland songs
Songs written by Jennifer Nettles
Songs written by Kristian Bush
Songs written by Kevin Griffin
Song recordings produced by Byron Gallimore
Mercury Nashville singles